Josep Vallverdú i Aixalà (born 1923) is a Catalan poet, novelist, playwright, linguist and essayist. Vallverdú was born in Lleida in 1923. His narrative Rovelló served as basis for a TV-series in TV3 (Catalonia). His works, rich in vocabulary, have been widely used in the Catalan classrooms. Vallverdú won in 1982 the National Spanish Prize in Children's Literature.

Works

Selected works for children
Trampa sota les aigües, 1965
Rovelló, 1969
En Roc Drapaire, 1971
L'home de les poyes, 1972
Un cavall contra Roma, 1975
Saberut i Cua-Verd, National Spanish Prize in Children's Literature, 1982
Indíbil i la boira, 1983
L'home de gregal, 1992

External links
 
 Official website
 Josep Vallverdú's website at AELC
 Josep Vallverdú's bibliography can be searched at the National Library of Catalonia

1923 births
Living people
People from Lleida
Catalan-language writers
Linguists from Catalonia
Premi d'Honor de les Lletres Catalanes winners
Members of the Institute for Catalan Studies